The Women's keirin competition at the 2018 UCI Track Cycling World Championships was held on 4 March 2018.

Results

First round
The first two riders in each heat qualified to the second round, all other riders advanced to the first round repechages.

Heat 1

Heat 3

Heat 2

Heat 4

First round repechage
The first rider in each heat qualified to the second round.

Heat 1

Heat 3

Heat 2

Heat 4

Second round
The first three riders in each heat qualified to final 1–6, all other riders advanced to final 7–12.

Heat 1

Heat 2

Finals
The finals were started at 14:56.

Small final

Final

References

Women's keirin
UCI Track Cycling World Championships – Women's keirin